The Vaughan Williams Memorial Library (VWML) is the library and archive of the English Folk Dance and Song Society (EFDSS), located in the society's London headquarters, Cecil Sharp House. It is a multi-media library comprising books, periodicals, audio-visual materials, photographic images and sound recordings, as well as manuscripts, field notes, transcriptions etc. of a number of collectors of folk music and dance traditions in the British Isles. According to A Dictionary of English Folklore, "... by a gradual process of professionalization the VWML has become the most important concentration of material on traditional song, dance, and music in the country."  It is named after Ralph Vaughan Williams, the composer, collector and past president of the EFDSS, who died in 1958.

Prior to that it was known as the Cecil Sharp Library, since his books constituted the bulk of the original holdings, but over the years the library has added literature, sound and manuscript collections of other folklorists and collectors such as Lucy Broadwood, Janet Blunt, Anne Gilchrist, George Butterworth, the Hammond brothers and George Gardiner. It also contains copies of the papers and notebooks of Sabine Baring-Gould, Ralph Vaughan Williams, Alfred Williams and James Madison Carpenter; and the field recordings of Percy Grainger, Mike Yates and the BBC Folk Music Archive.

Subjects covered include: Folk/traditional/popular song, Child Ballads, Broadside ballads, Industrial/occupational songs, sea songs/shanties, singing games, Nursery rhymes, Street cries, Carols/hymns, Rounds/glees/part songs, Music hall, Ritual/ceremonial dance, Morris dance/sword dance and a great deal more.

Online Archive

In May 2006, VWML Online was launched which hosts a number of the library's indexes to manuscript collections, together with its index to mummers' plays and the Roud Folk Song and Broadside Indexes, the largest of their kind in the English language.

The online material has been extended with the addition of a catalogue of the collection of books bequeathed by eminent folk music scholar Leslie Shepard. It is planned to extend this catalogue with the other available electronic media in the archive before converting the existing card catalogues.

The archives of six of the UK's most prominent folk song collectors are also available on-line as the "Take 6 archive" including both their indexes and over 22,000 images of collected material including over 5,000 songs.

Finally, both Cecil Sharp's Appalachian diaries from 1915-1918 (in manuscript and transcript form) and over 300 images taken from his photographic collection are available for viewing on-line. The latter are largely portraits of contributors to his music collections from North America and England.

External links
Vaughan Williams Memorial Library
VWML Online

English folk music
Libraries in the London Borough of Camden
Music archives in the United Kingdom
Ralph Vaughan Williams